The discography of Rachel Platten, an American singer and songwriter, consists of four studio albums, one extended play and six singles. Platten released her debut studio album Trust in Me in 2003, which she has called "a collection of demos". Her second album, Be Here, was released from Rock Ridge Music in 2011. Her 2011 single "1,000 Ships" peaked at number 24 on the US Billboard Adult Top 40 chart, also playing at various radio stations. In the spring of 2015, Platten released "Fight Song" from Wildfire. The song has been used in various media, as well as serving the official anthem for the 2016 Democratic presidential nominee Hillary Clinton. It reached number six on the US Billboard Hot 100, number two on the Australian Singles Chart, number six in Ireland, number eight in New Zealand, number nine on the Billboard Canadian Hot 100 and number one on the UK Singles Chart. It has double platinum sales in the US. Platten's 2015 Fight Song EP reached number 20 on the Billboard 200. On September 11, 2015, Platten released her second single, "Stand by You" from Wildfire. It has peaked in the top ten on charts in Canada and the United States, and has peaked in the top twenty on charts in Australia and Poland. The song has since been certified Platinum in the United States. "Broken Glass", the lead single from her fourth studio album, Waves, was released on August 18, 2017. The album was released on October 27, 2017.

Studio albums

Extended plays

Singles

As lead artist

As featured artist

Promotional singles

Other appearances

Notes

References

Discographies of American artists